Abovyan is a village in the Artashat Municipality of the Ararat Province of Armenia. It is named in honour of the writer Khachatur Abovyan.

References 

World Gazetteer: Armenia – World-Gazetteer.com
Report of the results of the 2001 Armenian Census

Populated places in Ararat Province
1830 establishments in the Russian Empire